In Roman mythology, Voluptas or Volupta is the daughter born from the union of Cupid and Psyche, according to Apuleius. The Latin word voluptas means 'pleasure' or 'delight'; Voluptas is known as the goddess of "sensual pleasures". She is often found in the company of the Gratiae, or Three Graces. 

Some Roman authors mention a goddess named Volupia, a name which appears to signify "willingness".. She had a temple, the Sacellum Volupiae, on the Via Nova, by the Porta Romana. Sacrifices were offered to the Diva Angerona there. 

The corresponding goddess in Greek mythology is Hedone.

See also
 Hercules at the crossroads

References

External links

 Theoi Project - Hedone/Voluptas

Roman goddesses

pt:Volúptas